Frederick Joseph Thome Bolaños (born 8 February 1966) is a Costa Rican former tennis player.

Thome is of Chilean descent on his mother's side of the family. His grandfather, Hernán Bolaños, was a footballer for the national side who played for the Audax Italiano club in Chile and married a local.

A runner-up at the Coffee Bowl in 1984, Thome is the elder brother of his Davis Cup teammate Kenneth. The pair teamed up together to win a bronze medal in doubles at the 1987 Pan American Games, which was Costa Rica's first ever Pan American Games tennis medal. Between 1990 and 1994 he appeared in nine Davis Cup ties, winning two singles and five doubles rubbers.

Thome, now a US based airline executive, played college tennis while studying at the University of Texas at Austin.

References

External links
 
 

1966 births
Living people
Costa Rican male tennis players
Texas Longhorns men's tennis players
Tennis players at the 1987 Pan American Games
Pan American Games medalists in tennis
Pan American Games bronze medalists for Costa Rica
Costa Rican people of Chilean descent
Medalists at the 1987 Pan American Games